"That's What I Like About the South" is the signature song of Phil Harris written by Andy Razaf and covered by Bob Wills and Cliff Bruner. Harris sang it in the 1945 film I Love a Bandleader, and performed it several times as part of The Jack Benny Program.

The lyrics reference many different foods that are typically identified as Cuisine of the Southern United States, such as Virginia hams, candied yams, and black-eyed peas.

References

External links 

https://www.discogs.com/Phil-Harris-Thats-What-I-Like-About-The-South/release/2912960
https://www.discogs.com/Phil-Harris-And-Orchestra-Thats-What-I-Like-About-The-South-Brazen-Little-Raisin/release/4480923
https://www.discogs.com/Phil-Harris-And-His-Orchestra-Thats-What-I-Like-About-The-South-If-Youre-Ever-Down-In-Texas-Look-Me-/release/8177532

Songs written by Andy Razaf